James Arthur Bédard (born November 17, 1956) is a Canadian retired ice hockey goaltender. He was most recently the goaltending coach for the Detroit Red Wings of the National Hockey League (NHL).

Career 
Originally drafted in 1976 by the Washington Capitals, Bédard played for parts of two seasons with the Capitals. After playing two seasons in the minor leagues, Bédard signed to play in the Finnish SM-liiga, After two seasons with HC TPS, he played in Finland for 12 seasons more, mostly in lower divisions, before finally retiring in 1994.

After his playing career, he served as the goaltending coach with the Detroit Red Wings for 19 seasons. He had won three Stanley Cups with Detroit in 1998, 2002 and 2008. On May 9, 2016, it was reported that Bédard's contract with the team would not be renewed.

Bédard is also the goalie coach for the Detroit Red Wings Alumni Association  and is active in its efforts to raise money for children's charities in Metro Detroit. As of 2016–17, Bédard is the goaltending coach for the OHL's Windsor Spitfires. Since 2017–18, Bedard has been the goaltending coach for the Texas Stars.

References

External links

Profile at hockeydraftcentral.com

1956 births
Living people
Canadian ice hockey goaltenders
Cincinnati Stingers (CHL) players
Dallas Stars coaches
Dayton Gems players
Detroit Red Wings coaches
Edmonton Oilers (WHA) draft picks
Hershey Bears players
HPK players
Ice hockey people from Ontario
Imatran Ketterä players
Rochester Americans players
Sportspeople from Niagara Falls, Ontario
Stanley Cup champions
Sudbury Wolves players
HC TPS players
Tulsa Oilers (1964–1984) players
TuTo players
Washington Capitals draft picks
Washington Capitals players
Canadian expatriate ice hockey players in Finland
Canadian expatriate ice hockey players in the United States
Canadian ice hockey coaches